Lib Island (Marshallese:) is an island in the Pacific Ocean. It is a legislative district of the Ralik Chain of the Marshall Islands. The population of Lib Island is 155.

History

The first recorded sighting by Europeans of Lib Island happened on 8 January 1565 by Spanish navigator Alonso de Arellano commanding patache San Lucas. It was charted by Arellano as Los Nadadores ("The Swimmers" in Spanish). In his account of the sighting, Arellano stated that the inhabitants of Lib would be fine for pulling an oar in a galley, being big and well made, and were a warlike people, being expert in throwing stones with slings. He also expressed an opinion that they must be of the Devil because their island was a thousand leagues from firm land.

Captain Thomas Dennet of the British vessel Britannia sighted the island in 1797 on route from Australia to China and named it Princess Island.

Education
Marshall Islands Public School System operates Lib Elementary School.

References

Marshall Islands site

Ralik Chain
Municipalities of the Marshall Islands